Ogemaw County is a county located in the U.S. state of Michigan. As of the 2020 Census, the population was 20,770. The county seat is West Branch.

The county newspaper of record is the Ogemaw Herald.

History

Ogemaw County started as part of the Virginia Land owned by England. After the Revolutionary War, it broke up into smaller and smaller pieces. The county was originally created by the Michigan Legislature in 1840 from unorganized territory, but was absorbed into Iosco County in 1867. It was re-created in 1873, and was finally organized in 1875. The county's name is an Anglicization of the Anishinaabemowin word ogimaa, meaning "chief". Ogemaw's name came from an eloquent, respected Native American orator named Little Elk. One of the first settlements in the county was Ogemaw Springs, the genesis of lumbering operations in the county. The settlement of Ogemaw Springs ended when the lumber industry in the region ended. (Due to the lumber industry, railways were built to transport the lumber, and towns often sprang up along the tracks. After timber supplies in the Midwest dwindled, loggers shifted westward to the Pacific Northwest to find new sources of lumber, and many of these fledgling settlements foundered.) With Ogemaw Springs in decline, the people flocked to West Branch, causing an economic boom, including the construction of its first hotel. This created even more growth, causing many restaurants, hotels, and businesses to be built, a vast majority of which still stand today.

Geography
Ogemaw County is considered to be part of Northern Michigan.

Highways
  – Runs SE across the southwest part of the county; passes south of West Branch.
  – Enters from Gladwin County at 5.5 miles (8.8 km) east of the SW corner of Ogemaw County; runs north and NE to intersection with M-55 near West Branch.
  – Runs north–south through the middle of county; passes Rose City.
  – Runs east–west across the lower part of county; enters from Iosco County at 6 miles (9.6 km) north of SE corner of Ogemaw County; runs west to intersection with I-75, west of West Branch.

Adjacent counties

 Oscoda County - north
 Alcona County - northeast
 Iosco County - east
 Arenac County - southeast
 Gladwin County - southwest
 Roscommon County - west
 Crawford County - northwest

National protected area
 Huron National Forest (part)

State protected area
 Au Sable State Forest (part)
 Rifle River State Recreation Area

Demographics

As of the 2000 United States Census, there were 21,645 people, 8,842 households, and 6,189 families residing in the county. The population density was 38 people per square mile (15/km2). There were 15,404 housing units at an average density of 27 per square mile (11/km2). The racial makeup of the county was 97.48% White, 0.13% Black or African American, 0.60% Native American, 0.38% Asian, 0.03% Pacific Islander, 0.13% from other races, and 1.25% from two or more races. 1.16% of the population were Hispanic or Latino of any race. 28.7% were of German, 12.3% American, 10.2% English, 9.2% Irish, 7.0% French and 6.7% Polish ancestry. 97.9% spoke only English at home.

There were 8,842 households, out of which 27.10% had children under the age of 18 living with them, 57.40% were married couples living together, 8.80% had a female householder with no husband present, and 30.00% were non-families. 25.70% of all households were made up of individuals, and 12.20% had someone living alone who was 65 years of age or older. The average household size was 2.41 and the average family size was 2.87.

The county population contained 23.50% under the age of 18, 6.40% from 18 to 24, 24.40% from 25 to 44, 27.00% from 45 to 64, and 18.80% who were 65 years of age or older. The median age was 42 years. For every 100 females there were 98.40 males. For every 100 females age 18 and over, there were 95.50 males.

The median income for a household in the county was $30,474, and the median income for a family was $34,988. Males had a median income of $31,003 versus $20,544 for females. The per capita income for the county was $15,768. About 11.00% of families and 14.00% of the population were below the poverty line, including 18.50% of those under age 18 and 9.90% of those age 65 or over.

Government
For many years, Ogemaw County has been reliably Republican. Since 1884, the Republican Party nominee has carried the county vote in 82% of the national presidential elections (28 of 35).

Ogemaw County operates the County jail, maintains rural roads, operates the major local courts, records deeds, mortgages, and vital records, administers public health regulations, and participates with the state in the provision of social services. The county board of commissioners controls the budget and has limited authority to make laws or ordinances. In Michigan, most local government functions – police and fire, building and zoning, tax assessment, street maintenance etc. – are the responsibility of individual cities and townships.

Elected officials

 Prosecuting Attorney – LaDonna A. Schultz
 Sheriff – Brian D. Gilbert
 County Clerk – Breck Gildner
 County Treasurer – Caren Piglowski
 Register of Deeds – Denise Simmons
 Drain Commissioner – Michael DeMatio
 Commissioner Dist. 1 – Craig Scott
 Commissioner Dist. 2 – Mark Surbrook
 Commissioner Dist. 3 – Ronald Vaughn
 Commissioner Dist. 4 – Brad Neubecker
 Commissioner Dist. 5 – Jenny David

(information as of February 2021)

Communities

Cities
 Rose City
 West Branch (county seat)

Village
 Prescott

Civil townships

 Churchill Township
 Cumming Township
 Edwards Township
 Foster Township
 Goodar Township
 Hill Township
 Horton Township
 Klacking Township
 Logan Township
 Mills Township
 Ogemaw Township
 Richland Township
 Rose Township
 West Branch Township

Census-designated places
 Lupton
 Skidway Lake

Other unincorporated communities

 Camp Lu Lay Lea
 Campbells Corners
 Damon
 Edwards
 Elbow Lake
 Fayettes Corner
 Goodar
 Greenwood
 Ogemaw Springs
 Selkirk
 Shady Shores
 South Branch

See also
 List of Michigan State Historic Sites in Ogemaw County, Michigan
 National Register of Historic Places listings in Ogemaw County, Michigan

References

External links
 Ogemaw County Website
 Ogemaw County Herald - local newspaper
 

 
Michigan counties
1875 establishments in Michigan
Populated places established in 1875
Michigan placenames of Native American origin